The Oretani or Oretanii (Greek: Orissioi) were a pre-Roman ancient Iberian people (in the geographical sense) of the Iberian Peninsula (the Roman Hispania), that lived in northeastern Andalusia, in the upper Baetis (Guadalquivir) river valley, eastern Marianus Mons (Sierra Morena), and the southern area of present-day La Mancha.

Origins
They could have been an Iberian tribe, a Celtic one, or a mixed Celtic and Iberian tribe or tribal confederacy (and hence related to the Celtiberians). The Mantesani/Mentesani/Mantasani of present-day La Mancha and the Germani (of Oretania) in eastern Marianus Mons (Sierra Morena) and west Jabalón river valley are sometimes included in the Oretani, but it is not certain if they were Oretani tribes.

Territory 

Oretania, the country of the Oretani, was located in the eastern Sierra Morena, which included most of the province of Ciudad Real except its western end, the northern section of the province of Jaén, the western half of the province of Albacete. The Roman geographer Pliny the Elder lists 14 cities, including Tuia/Tugia (perhaps Toya), Salaria (perhaps Úbeda/Baeza), Biatia, Castulo/Castulum (presumed capital, later becoming a Visigothic bishopric; medieval name Cazlona, in Jaén), Luparia, Cervaria and Salica, whilst Diodorus Siculus lists 12 towns.

Other sources mention the towns of Libissosa (perhaps Lezuza), Amtorgis, Ilorci, Helicen/Helike (perhaps Elche de la Sierra or Elche), Baecula/Bekor (Bailén, Jaén), Ilucia, Nobila and Cusibi.

Culture 

They are believed by some to have spoken an Iberian language, by others to have been Celtic language, akin to the Celtiberians, as the northern Oretani were also called Germani and Mantesani.
The main archaeological sites in the oretanian area are Linares, La Carolina, Montiel, Valdepeñas, Almagro, Oreto and Zuqueca, and Cerro de las Cabezas.

History 
The Oretani remained independent until the late 3rd Century BC, when their powerful King Orison was defeated at the Battle of Helicen in 228 BC. Orison's defeat in 227 BC and the subsequent alliance with Carthage, however, caused major friction with their Germani allies who continued to resist Punic expansion until being subdued by Hannibal in 221 BC; the latter were certainly amongst the Oretani troops sent to Africa at the outbreak of the Second Punic War.

Romanization 
Like the Germani, the Oretani appear to have adopted a less hostile stance towards Rome and in 156 BC both peoples were included into Hispania Citerior Province, though retaining their Iberian cultural identity for several more centuries.

See also 
 Biche of Balazote
 Germani (Oretania)
 Pre-Roman peoples of the Iberian Peninsula

Notes

References 

 Ángel Montenegro et alii, Historia de España 2 - colonizaciones y formación de los pueblos prerromanos (1200-218 a.C), Editorial Gredos, Madrid (1989) 
 Francisco Burillo Motoza, Los Celtíberos – Etnias y Estados, Crítica, Grijalbo Mondadori, S.A., Barcelona (1998, revised edition 2007) 
 Juan Pereira Siesto (coord.), Prehistoria y Protohistoria de la Meseta Sur (Castilla-La Mancha), Biblioteca Añil n.º 31, ALMUD, Ediciones de Castilla-La Mancha, Ciudad Real (2007)

External links 

Detailed map of the Pre-Roman Peoples of Iberia (around 200 BC)

Pre-Roman peoples of the Iberian Peninsula
Ancient peoples of Spain